Yo Momma is an American television show based upon insulting one's mother. Creators, executive producers and hosts are Wilmer Valderrama, along with Sam Sarpong (Seasons 1 and 2), Jason Everhart and Destiny Lightsy. The show was produced from April 2006 to December 2007, and, as the title suggests, used "yo momma" jokes; many episodes featured guest appearances from rappers.

Season 1 was in Los Angeles, season 2 was in New York City, and season 3 was in Atlanta.

The Yo Momma Online Network
In conjunction with Yo Momma, MTV launched YoMomma.tv, a Web 2.0 community dedicated to increasing viewer engagement with the program, and heavily promoted during Yo Momma episodes. Site users construct a profile and upload their own yo momma jokes (or "disses"), and attempt to boost their rankings on the site by challenging other users to "Battles", exchanges of uploaded disses between two users. Both disses and Battles are voted on by the user community.

A corollary feature is "Let's Bully", which allows users to send insults over e-mail using an avatar of the user's face superimposed over modifiable clip art. The Let's Bully feature was the subject of an article in Adweek Magazine.

References

External links
 
 

MTV original programming
MTV weekday shows
2006 American television series debuts
2007 American television series endings
English-language television shows
2000s American game shows
Comedy catchphrases
Television series by Evolution Film & Tape